Condylostylis is a small genus of flowering plants in the legume family, Fabaceae. It belongs to the subfamily Faboideae. Species in this genus were formerly considered to belong to the genus Vigna.

There are four species in the genus Condylostylis:
Condylostylis candida (Vellozo) A. Delgado
Condylostylis latidenticulata (Harms) A. Delgado
Condylostylis venusta Piper
Condylostylis vignoides (Rusby) A. Delgado

References

Phaseoleae
Fabaceae genera